Wilkes Angel (February 26, 1817 Exeter, Otsego County, New York - February 1889) was an American lawyer and politician from New York.

Life
He was the son of William G. Angel and Emily P. (English) Angel (1790–1822). In 1833, he removed with his father to Hammondsport, New York, and in 1835 to Angelica, New York. He attended the common schools, studied law with his father, was admitted to the bar, and practiced in Angelica.

He was District Attorney of Allegany County from 1841 to 1844. On December 23, 1841, he married Hannah Marble. He was Supervisor of Angelica in 1849, 1850 and 1861. He was a Republican member of the New York State Assembly (Allegany Co., 1st D.) in 1861. He was a member of the New York State Senate (30th D.) from 1862 to 1865, sitting in the 85th, 86th, 87th and 88th New York State Legislatures.

In 1859, the county seat of Allegany County was transferred to Belmont, and after his tenure in the State Senate Angel moved his law practice there. In 1876, he was appointed Receiver of the Belmont and Buffalo Railroad.

New York State Prison Inspector William P. Angel; Washington Territorial Council member James R. Angel (1836–1899); and Texas Angel (1839–1903), a lawyer in Hailey, Idaho, and Populist contender for U.S. Senator from Idaho in 1897); were his brothers.

References
WILKES ANGEL in Biographical Sketches of the State Officers and Members of the Legislature of the State of New York] by William D. Murphy (1863; pages 42f)
The New York Civil List compiled by Franklin Benjamin Hough, Stephen C. Hutchins and Edgar Albert Werner (1867; pages 358, 443f, 492 and 507)
ANGELICA COLLECTANEA & OBITUARIES compiled by L. L. Stillwell, at RootsWeb
DEATH LIST OF A DAY;...Ex-Justice James R. Angel'' in NYT on October 5, 1899
No Choice in Idaho in NYT on January 17, 1897

1817 births
1889 deaths
People from Otsego County, New York
Republican Party New York (state) state senators
Republican Party members of the New York State Assembly
People from Angelica, New York
County district attorneys in New York (state)
Town supervisors in New York (state)
19th-century American railroad executives
19th-century American politicians